Career ambassador is a personal rank of Foreign Service Officers within the United States Department of State Senior Foreign Service. The rank of career ambassador is awarded by nomination of the President and confirmation by the United States Senate. According to the Department of State:

List of career ambassadors
Listed by date of appointment. Names on this list are drawn from the U.S. Department of State's list of career ambassadors, except where another reference is given.

References

See also
Senior Foreign Service
Diplomatic rank
Ambassadors of the United States